Phytonemus is a monotypic genus of mites belonging to the family Tarsonemidae. The only species is Phytonemus pallidus.

The species is found in Northern America and Europe.

References

Trombidiformes
Trombidiformes genera
Monotypic arachnid genera